The Vasile Cabinet was the 113th cabinet of Romania, which was formed 17 April 1998 and dissolved 22 December 1999, with Radu Vasile as head of government. It was a coalition cabinet formed between the winner of the elections, CDR (Convenția Democrată Română, the Romanian Democratic Convention, which included PNȚCD, PNL, PER), USD (Uniunea Social Democrată, the Social Democratic Union, which included PD and PSDR), and UDMR.

Members

Prime Minister: 
Radu Vasile/Alexandru Athanasiu (ad  interim)

Ministers of State:
Victor Babiuc
Valeriu Stoica

Ministers:
Valeriu Stoica (Justice)
Victor Babiuc (Defense)
Daniel Dăianu/Decebal Traian Remeș (Finance)
Ion Caramitru (Culture)
Nicolae Noica (Public Works)
Dinu Gavrilescu/Ioan Avram Mureșan (Agriculture)
Francisc Baranyi/Gábor Hajdú (Health)
Andrei Pleșu (Foreign Affairs)
Radu Berceanu (Industry and Commerce)
Alexandru Athanasiu (Labor)
Sorin Pantiș (Communications)
Romică Tomescu (Environment)
Traian Băsescu (Transport)
Gavril Dejeu/Constantin Dudu Ionescu (Interior)
Andrei Marga (Education)
Ioan Avram Mureşan/Victor Babiuc (Reform)
Horia Ene/Valeriu Stoica (Research and Technology)
Crin Antonescu (Youth and Sport)
Alexandru Sassu (Relation with Parliament)
Sorin Frunzăverde (Tourism)

Minister-Delegates:
Alexandru Herlea (European Integration)
György Tokay/Péter Eckstein-Kovács (National Minorities)

Vasile I Cabinet
1998 establishments in Romania
1999 disestablishments in Romania
Cabinets established in 1998
Cabinets disestablished in 1999